Nadir Zortea (born 19 June 1999) is an Italian professional footballer who plays as a right-back for  club Sassuolo, on loan from Atalanta.

Club career

Atalanta
Zortea played for Atalanta under-19 squad in the 2017–18 and 2018–19 seasons, but has not been called up to the senior squad yet.

Loan to Cremonese
On 30 July 2019, he joined Serie B club Cremonese on a two-year loan.

He made his professional Serie B debut for Cremonese on 24 August 2019 in a game against Venezia. He substituted Michele Castagnetti in the added time.

Loan to Salernitana
On 19 July 2021, he joined Serie A club Salernitana on loan.

Loan to Sassuolo
On 31 January 2023, Zortea moved on loan to Sassuolo, with an option to buy.

Career statistics

References

Living people
1999 births
People from Feltre
Sportspeople from the Province of Belluno
Italian footballers
Footballers from Veneto
Association football defenders
Serie A players
Serie B players
Atalanta B.C. players
U.S. Cremonese players
U.S. Salernitana 1919 players
U.S. Sassuolo Calcio players